"Don't Leave Me Now" is a song by Belgian DJ Lost Frequencies and French DJ Mathieu Koss. It was released on 31 July 2020 via Armada Music. The song was written by Felix De Laet, Joren van der Voort, Christon Kloosterboer, Dalton Dielh, Mathieu Bordaraud and Peter Hanna, and produced by De Laet and Bordaraud.

Composition
The song is written in the key of F♯ Minor, with a tempo of 125 beats per minute.

Track listing

Charts

Weekly charts

Year-end charts

Certifications

References

2020 songs
2020 singles
Lost Frequencies songs
Songs written by Lost Frequencies
Songs written by Peter Hanna